The men's 100 metre butterfly event at the 2004 Olympic Games was contested at the Olympic Aquatic Centre of the Athens Olympic Sports Complex in Athens, Greece on August 19 and 20.

U.S. swimmer Michael Phelps broke an Olympic record of 51.25 to claim his fifth gold medal, edging out his teammate and world record holder Ian Crocker by four hundredths of a second (0.04). Meanwhile, Ukraine's Andriy Serdinov earned a bronze in a European record of 51.36. Earlier in the semifinals, Serdinov blasted a new Olympic record, previously set by Australia's Geoff Huegill in Sydney four years ago, with a time of 51.74. One heat later, Phelps stopped the clock at 51.61 to lower the record by 0.13 of a second.

Records
Prior to this competition, the existing world and Olympic records were as follows.

The following new world and Olympic records were set during this competition.

Results

Heats

Semifinals

Semifinal 1

Semifinal 2

Final

References

M
Men's 100 metre butterfly
Men's events at the 2004 Summer Olympics